Obljaj is a village in the municipality of Bosansko Grahovo, Canton 10 of the Federation of Bosnia and Herzegovina, an entity of Bosnia and Herzegovina.

Gavrilo Princip, whose assassination of Archduke Franz Ferdinand of Austria started World War I, was born here in 1894 and lived here when he was young.

Demographics 

According to the 2013 census, its population was 108.

Footnotes

Bibliography 

 
 

Populated places in Bosansko Grahovo
Villages in the Federation of Bosnia and Herzegovina